The Australian National Youth Championships is a series of annual youth events run by the Australian Baseball Federation. There are tournaments for U18 (AAA), U16 (AA) and U14 (A) levels and are competed by Queensland, New South Wales, Victoria, South Australia, Western Australia, Territories (ACT & North Territory), New South Wales Country and Victoria Provincial.

Teams are picked by the state governing bodies from their respective state titles. The tournaments also serve a purpose for national teams to be picked.

Stat Leaders
These are the top stat leaders each tournament:

AAA Leaders

See also
Baseball awards#Australia

External links
National Youth Championship home

Youth Championships
Youth baseball competitions
Youth sport in Australia